Volodymyr Mykolayovych Borysevych  (born November 3, 1969) is a Ukrainian football player who played as the attacker.

Biography 
Borysevych played for FC Volyn Lutsk, and for the Ukrainian first league Bukovina and the club Dniester, also played a short time in the Higher Moldovan division for the Agro Club. Borysevych Volodymyr for a long time played in the amateur teams of the Ivano-Frankivsk region and is a record holder from the goals of the Championship of the Ivano-Frankivsk region in football.

Volodymyr Borysevych began his football career after serving in the army in the team of the Amateur Team Kolomyia "Pokuta" in 1991.
In March 1993, Borysevych received an invitation to the team of the Higher League "Volyn".

References

Ukrainian footballers
Soviet footballers
1969 births
Living people
FC Pokuttia Kolomyia players
FC Dnister Zalishchyky players
FC Volyn Lutsk players
FC Agro-Goliador Chișinău players
FC Bukovyna Chernivtsi players
Association football forwards